Chee Swee Lee (born 10 January 1955) is a Singaporean middle-distance runner who competed in the 400 and 800 metres. She competed in the women's 800 metres at the 1976 Summer Olympics.

Athletic career 
At 14 years old, Chee represented Singapore in the 400m event at the 1969 Southeast Asian Peninsular Games (SEAP Games). She won the silver medal.

At the 1971 SEAP Games, Chee won the silver in the 4x400m relay and the bronze medal in the 400m event At the 1973 SEAP Games, Chee won two individual silvers in the 400m and 800m and the team silver in the 4x400m relay.

At the 1974 Asian Games, Chee competed in the 400m event and won the gold medal with 55.08 seconds, setting a Games record and Singapore national record for the 400m. She also won a silver in the women’s 4x400m and bronze in the 4x100m relays.

At the 1975 SEAP Games, Chee won the 400m and 800m events and the silver medal at 4x400m relay. Chee competed in the 400m race at the 1976 Olympics but did not finish her heat due to an injury sustained before the event. She also took part in the 1981 Southeast Asian Games.

Personal life 
After her athletic career in Singapore, Chee moved to the United States and studied at Mt. San Antonio College and California State Polytechnic University, Pomona. She continued with college and club competitions while studying and won athletic scholarships for her studies.

Chee is married and stays in Las Vegas, Nevada. She is working as a real estate agent.

References

External links
 

1955 births
Living people
Singaporean female sprinters
Singaporean female middle-distance runners
Olympic athletes of Singapore
Athletes (track and field) at the 1974 British Commonwealth Games
Athletes (track and field) at the 1974 Asian Games
Athletes (track and field) at the 1976 Summer Olympics
Asian Games gold medalists for Singapore
Asian Games silver medalists for Singapore
Asian Games bronze medalists for Singapore
Asian Games medalists in athletics (track and field)
Medalists at the 1974 Asian Games
Place of birth missing (living people)
Commonwealth Games competitors for Singapore
Southeast Asian Games gold medalists for Singapore
Southeast Asian Games silver medalists for Singapore
Southeast Asian Games bronze medalists for Singapore
Southeast Asian Games medalists in athletics
20th-century Singaporean women